The wedge-rumped storm petrel (Hydrobates tethys) is a storm petrel. It breeds in the Galápagos Islands and on the coast of Peru. It was formerly defined in the genus Oceanodroma before that genus was synonymized with Hydrobates.

References

External links
 Wedge-rumped storm-petrel [Oceanodroma tethys] - photos, Christopher Taylor Nature Photography

wedge-rumped storm petrel
Birds of the Americas
Birds of the Pacific Ocean
wedge-rumped storm petrel
wedge-rumped storm petrel